Araneri Achaleswarar Temple (அரநெறி அசலேஸ்வரர் கோயில்) is a Hindu temple located in the premises of Thyagaraja Temple in Tiruvarur of Tiruvarur district, Tamil Nadu, India.  Historical name of this place is Arur Araneri. The temple is dedicated to Shiva, as the moolavar presiding deity, in his manifestation as Araneriyappar. His consort, Parvati, is known as 	Vandarakuzhali.

Significance 
It is one of the shrines of the 275 Paadal Petra Sthalams - Shiva Sthalams glorified in the early medieval Tevaram poems by Tamil Saivite Nayanar Tirunavukkarasar.

References

External links 
 
 

Shiva temples in Tiruvarur district
Padal Petra Stalam